Tacachi is a location in the Cochabamba Department in central Bolivia. It is the seat of the Tacachi Municipality, the fourth municipal section of the Punata Province.

References 

  Instituto Nacional de Estadistica de Bolivia  (INE)

External links 
 Population data and map of Tacachi Municipality

Populated places in Cochabamba Department